Cass Township is a township in Clayton County, Iowa, USA.  As of the 2000 census, its population was 1,835.

History
Cass Township is named for Lewis Cass.

Geography
According to the USGS, it contains three cemeteries: County Courners, Saint Mary's, and Strawberry Point Methodist.

Notes

References
 USGS Geographic Names Information System (GNIS)

External links
 US-Counties.com
 City-Data.com

Townships in Clayton County, Iowa
Townships in Iowa